The Saudi Arabia national handball team is the national handball team of Saudi Arabia and is controlled by the Saudi Arabian Handball Federation. The team has participated in the 2003 World Men's Handball Championship and 2009.

Results

World Championship

Asian Championship

Current squad
Squad for the 2023 World Men's Handball Championship.

Head coach: Jan Pytlick

References

External links

IHF profile

Men's national handball teams
Handball in Saudi Arabia
National sports teams of Saudi Arabia